Mexico City Metro Line A is one of the twelve metro lines operating in Mexico City, Mexico. The line's color is purple. It was the ninth line to be opened.

The line was opened in 1983 and it runs from eastern Mexico City southeast into the State of Mexico. It was the second line to service the State of Mexico, after the Cuatro Caminos station of the Line 2, opened in 1984.

History
Line A was inaugurated on August 12, 1991 by Carlos Salinas de Gortari, President of Mexico from 1988 to 1994, Manuel Camacho Solís, Head of the Federal District Department from 1988 to 1993, and Ignacio Pichardo Pagaza, Governor of the State of Mexico from 1989 to 1993. 

Line A was conceived as a feeder line, thus, instead of using a number (which, in this case, it would have been 10 – Line 10), it used a letter in its denomination. The line was designed to connect Mexico City to the State of Mexico. For this reason, until December 2013, it was necessary to pay another fare when commuting from Line A to Lines 1, 5 and 9 at Pantitlán station.

Another feeder line, also connecting the State of Mexico to Mexico City, would be inaugurated in 1999: Line B, also using a letter instead of a number to designate it.

A proposed extension of the line was presented in 2018 by the Sistema de Transporte Colectivo. According to the plan, Line A would be expanded southbound towards Chalco in the State of Mexico.

Rolling stock
Line A has had different types of rolling stock throughout the years.

Concarril FM-86: 1991–present
Concarril FM-95A: 1998–present
CAF FE-07: 2010–present   

Currently, out of the 390 trains in the Mexico City Metro network, 17 are in service in Line A.

Station list

The stations from east to west: 
{| class="wikitable" rules="all"
|-
!rowspan="2" | No.
!rowspan="2" | Station
!rowspan="2" | Date opened
!rowspan="2" | Level
!colspan="2" | Distance (km)
!rowspan="2" | Connection
!rowspan="2" colspan="2" | Location
|-
!style="font-size: 65%;"|Betweenstations
!style="font-size: 65%;"|Total
|-
|style="background: #; color: white;"|01
|Pantitlán 
| rowspan="10" |12 August 1991
|Underground
|style="text-align:right;"|-
|style="text-align:right;"|0.0
|
  Line 1 (out of service)
  Line 5
  Line 9
 Pantitlán
  Line 4 (Alameda Oriente branch): Pantitlán station
  Line III: Pantitlán station (temporary Line1 service)
 Route: 168 (temporary Line1 service)
  Line 2: Pantitlán stop
 Routes: 11-B, 11-C, 19-F, 19-G
| Iztacalco / Venustiano Carranza
| rowspan="8" | Mexico City
|-
|style="background: #; color: white;"|02
|Agrícola Oriental
| rowspan="9" |Grade-level, overground access
|style="text-align:right;"|1.6
|style="text-align:right;"|1.6
|
 Routes: 162-B, 163, 163-A, 163-B, 164, 166, 167
 Route: 11-G
| rowspan="2" | Iztacalco
|-
|style="background: #; color: white;"|03
|Canal de San Juan
|style="text-align:right;"|1.2
|style="text-align:right;"|2.8
|
  Line 2: Canal de San Juan station (at distance)
 Routes: 47-A, 162-B, 163, 163-A, 163-B, 164, 166, 167
 Routes: 4-B, 4-C, 9-B (at distance), 9-E (at distance), 14-A (at distance)
|-
|style="background: #; color: white;"|04
|Tepalcates 
|style="text-align:right;"|1.6
|style="text-align:right;"|4.4
|
 Tepalcates
  Line 2: Tepalcates station
 Routes: 162-B, 163, 163-A, 163-B, 164, 166, 167
 Routes: 9-D, 9-E
| rowspan=5 | Iztapalapa
|-
|style="background: #; color: white;"|05
|Guelatao
|style="text-align:right;"|1.3
|style="text-align:right;"|5.7
|
 Routes: 162-B, 163, 163-A, 163-B, 164, 166, 167
 Route: 9-D
|-
|style="background: #; color: white;"|06
|Peñón Viejo
|style="text-align:right;"|2.4
|style="text-align:right;"|8.1
|
 Routes: 162-B, 163, 163-A, 163-B, 164, 166, 167
|-
|style="background: #; color: white;"|07
|Acatitla
|style="text-align:right;"|1.5
|style="text-align:right;"|9.6
|
 Routes: 162-B, 163, 163-A, 163-B, 164, 166, 167
|-
|style="background: #; color: white;"|08
|Santa Marta 
|style="text-align:right;"|1.3
|style="text-align:right;"|10.9
|
 Santa Marta
  Line 2: Santa Marta station
  Line 10: Santa Marta station (under construction)
  Line 11: Santa Marta station (under construction)
 Routes: 1-D, 52-C

|-
|style="background: #; color: white;"|09
|Los Reyes 
|style="text-align:right;"|1.9
|style="text-align:right;"|12.8
|
| rowspan=2 | La Paz
| rowspan=2 | State of Mexico
|-
|style="background: #; color: white;"|10
|La Paz 
|style="text-align:right;"|2.1
|style="text-align:right;"|14.9
|
 La Paz
|}

Ridership
The following table shows each of Line 6 stations total and average daily ridership during 2019.

See also
 List of Mexico City Metro lines

Notes

References

A
Railway lines opened in 1991
1991 establishments in Mexico